The Wenzaobang or Wenzao River, often mispronounced as Yunzaobang, is a river in Shanghai, China.

References

Rivers of Shanghai